iBook is a line of laptop computers designed, manufactured, and sold by Apple Computer from 1999 to 2006. The line targeted entry-level, consumer and education markets, with lower specifications and prices than the PowerBook, Apple's higher-end line of laptop computers. It was the first mass consumer product to offer Wi-Fi network connectivity, which was then branded by Apple as AirPort.

The iBook had three different designs during its lifetime. The first, known as the "Clamshell", was inspired by the design of Apple's popular iMac line at the time. It was a significant departure from previous portable computer designs due to its shape, bright colors, incorporation of a handle into the casing, lack of a display closing latch, lack of a hinged cover over the external ports and built-in wireless networking. Two years later, the second generation abandoned the original form factor in favor of a more conventional, rectangular design. In October 2003, the third generation was introduced, adding a PowerPC G4 chip, USB 2.0 and a slot-loading drive.

They were very popular in education, with Henrico County Public Schools being the first of many school systems in the United States to distribute one to every student.

Apple replaced the iBook line with the MacBook in May 2006 during the Mac transition to Intel processors.

iBook G3 ("Clamshell") 

In the late 1990s, Apple was trimming its product line from the bewildering variety of intersecting Performa, Quadra, LC, Power Macintosh and PowerBook models to a simplified "four box" strategy: desktop and portable computers, each in both consumer and professional models. Three boxes of this strategy were already in place: The newly introduced iMac was the consumer desktop, the Blue and White G3 filled the professional desktop box, and the PowerBook line served as the professional portable line. This left only the consumer portable space empty, leading to much rumor on the Internet of potential designs and features. Putting an end to this speculation, on July 21, 1999, Steve Jobs unveiled the iBook G3 during the keynote presentation of Macworld Conference & Expo, New York City.

Like the iMac, the iBook G3 had a PowerPC G3 CPU, and no legacy Apple interfaces. USB, Ethernet, modem ports and an optical drive were standard. The ports were left uncovered along the left side, as a cover was thought to be fragile and unnecessary with the iBook's new interfaces, which lacked the exposed pins of earlier connectors. When the lid was closed, the hinge kept it firmly shut, so there was no need for a latch on the screen. The hinge included an integrated carrying handle. Additional power connectors on the bottom surface allowed multiple iBook G3s to be charged on a custom-made rack. The iBook G3 was the first Mac to use Apple's new "Unified Logic Board Architecture", which condensed all of the machine's core features into two chips, and added AGP and Ultra DMA support.

The iBook was the first mainstream computer designed and sold with integrated wireless networking.  On the iBook's introduction, Phil Schiller, Apple's VP of Marketing, held an iBook while jumping off a height as data from the computer was transferred to another in order to demonstrate the wireless networking capability. The display bezel contained the wireless antenna, which attached to an optional internal wireless card. Lucent helped create this wireless capability which established the industry standard. Apple released the AirPort Wireless Base Station at the same time.

There was heated debate over many things such as the aesthetics, features, weight, performance and pricing.  To provide sufficient impact protection, the iBook was larger and heftier than the PowerBook of the time, and yet had lower specifications. Standard features like PC card slots were absent, and so were speculated features such as touch screens and an ultra-long battery life. The iBook gained the label "Barbie's toilet seat", due to the distinctive design. Nevertheless, this same design made the iBook G3 unmistakable in movies and television shows.

The iBook was a commercial success. The line continually received processor, memory, hard disk upgrades and new colors. FireWire and video out were later added. The design was discontinued in May 2001, in favor of the new "Dual USB" iBooks.

Design 

The design was clearly influenced by Apple's consumer desktop, the iMac. In fact, one of the marketing slogans for the iBook was "iMac to go." The clamshell design also echoed the eMate 300. Apple continued its trend of using transparent colored plastics for the shell, and released the iBook clamshell series in several colors, starting with Blueberry and Tangerine, later adding Indigo, Graphite and Key Lime colors. However, unlike the iMac, the iBook did not feature pinstripes. Steve Jobs announced that the Key Lime color, "a little less conservative, a little more fun", was exclusive to the online Apple Store. This resulted in some crowd members booing, to which Jobs replied: "Don't you like buying on the Apple Online Store?"

Compared to follow-up iBook and PowerBook notebook computers, the Clamshell iBook proved to be the more reliable model. The original iBook is on exhibition at the London Design Museum and the Yale University Art Gallery. Vestiges of design ideas first adopted in the iBook G3 can still be seen today: moving interface ports from the back to the sides and leaving them uncovered, omitting a latch for the computer's lid, and providing multiple color options.

Technical specifications

Expandability and upgrades 
The original iBook's only customer-serviceable parts were the RAM and AirPort card, accessed via two slots under the keyboard. No other modifications were possible in-warranty. There was no PCMCIA port for additional expansion capabilities. 40 screws needed to be removed to access the hard drive. The optical drive, however, can be accessed far more easily, requiring only 11 screws and one standoff to be removed. Later on, some users transplanted a 1024×768 LCD from the more recent white iBook into a clamshell iBook. This is only possible with the "FireWire" and "FireWire SE" models, as they have 8 MB of video RAM; the older ones only have 4 MB.

All clamshell iBooks shipped with Mac OS 8.6 or 9.0. All clamshell iBooks supported Mac OS X 10.0 through 10.3.9. Mac OS X Tiger (v10.4) can also be installed.

iBook G3 Dual USB ("Snow") 

Apple debuted the next-generation iBook G3 at a press conference in Cupertino, California, on May 1, 2001. The previous bold colors and bulky form-factor were abandoned, as were the handle, latch-less design and additional power connectors on the bottom surface.

The resulting iBook was available in white only, hence the name "Snow" and incorporated transparent polycarbonate in its casing. It was 30% lighter, and occupied less than half of the volume of the model it replaced, being smaller in all three dimensions. Despite that, it added an extra USB port and a higher resolution screen. Apple claimed the compact design did not sacrifice durability, saying it was "Twice as durable" as the previous model.

With this revision, Apple began transitioning to translucent and white polycarbonate casings in most of its consumer line, such as the iMac and the eMac. In contrast, most of its professional products used an anodized aluminum finish. Near the end of its run, the Snow iBook G3 case became opaque and white instead of translucent white and magnesium.

Technical specifications 
All Obsolete

iBook G4 ("Snow") 

Apple added a PowerPC G4 chip to the iBook line on October 23, 2003, finally ending Apple's use of the PowerPC G3 chip. A slot-loading optical drive replaced the disc tray. The iBook G4 notebook also features an opaque white case finish and keyboard and a plastic display hinge. This is also the last iBook laptop released before MacBooks replaced the iBook line in 2006.

Technical specifications 

{| class="wikitable mw-collapsible" style="font-size:small; text-align:center"
! colspan=2 | Model
! colspan=3 style="background:#FF9999" | Late 2003
! colspan=3 style="background:#FF9999" | Early 2004
! colspan=3 style="background:#FF9999" | Late 2004
! colspan=2 style="background:#FF9999" | Mid 2005

|-
! rowspan=2 | Timetable
! Released
| colspan=3 | October 22, 2003
| colspan=3 | April 19, 2004
| colspan=3 | October 19, 2004
| colspan=2 | July 26, 2005
|-
! Discontinued
| colspan=3 | April 19, 2004
| colspan=3 | October 19, 2004
| colspan=3 | July 26, 2005
| colspan=2 | May 16, 2006

|-
! colspan=2 | Color
| colspan=11 | Opaque White

|-
! rowspan=3 | Ordering info.
! Order number
| M9164
| M9388
| M9165
| M9426
| M9418
| M9419
| M9623
| M9627
| M9628
| M9846
| M9848

|-
! Model identifier
| colspan=3 | PowerBook 6,3
| colspan=6 | PowerBook 6,5
| colspan=2 | PowerBook 6,7

|-
! Model number
| A1054
| colspan=2 | A1055
| A1054
| colspan=2 | A1055
| A1054
| colspan=2 | A1055
| A1133
| A1134

|-
! rowspan=5 | Performance
! Processor
! colspan=3 | PowerPC G4 (7457)
! colspan=8 | PowerPC G4 (7447A)

|-
! Clock speed
| 800 MHz
| 933 MHz
| 1 GHz
| colspan=2 | 1.07 GHz
| colspan=2 | 1.2 GHz
| colspan=3 | 1.33 GHz
| 1.42 GHz

|-
! Cache
| colspan=3 | 64 KB L1, 256 KB L2 cache (1:1)
| colspan=8 | 64 KB L1, 512 KB L2 cache (1:1)

|-
! Front side bus
| colspan=10 | 133 MHz
| 142 MHz

|-
! Memory
| colspan=3 | 256 MB of 266 MHz PC2100 DDR SDRAM (128 soldered to logic board)
| colspan=6 | 256 MB of 266 MHz PC2100 DDR SDRAM (soldered to logic board)
| colspan=2 | 512 MB of 333 MHz PC2700 DDR SDRAM (soldered to logic board)

|-
! rowspan=4 | Video
! rowspan=2 | Display
| 12.1"
| colspan=2 | 14.1"
| 12.1"
| colspan=2 | 14.1"
| 12.1"
| colspan=2 | 14.1"
| 12.1"
| 14.1"
|-
| colspan=11 | TFT XGA active matrix display, 1024×768 pixel resolution

|-
! rowspan=2 | Graphics
| colspan=9 | ATI Radeon 9200 with 32 MB of SDRAM
| colspan=2 | ATI Radeon 9550 with 32 MB of SDRAM

|-
| colspan=11 | AGP 4x

|-
! rowspan=2 | Storage
! Hard drive
| 30 GB 4200-rpm Ultra/ATA 100
| 40 GB 4200-rpm Ultra/ATA 100
| 60 GB 4200-rpm Ultra/ATA 100
| 30 GB 4200-rpm Ultra/ATA 100
| 40 GB 4200-rpm Ultra/ATA 100
| 60 GB 4200-rpm Ultra/ATA 100
| 30 GB 4200-rpm Ultra/ATA 100
| colspan=2 | 60 GB 4200-rpm Ultra/ATA 100
| 40 GB 4200-rpm Ultra/ATA 100
| 60 GB 4200-rpm Ultra/ATA 100

|-
! Optical driveSlot-loading
| colspan=3 | DVD-ROM/CD-RW Combo Drive
| colspan=5 | DVD-ROM/CD-RW Combo Drive
| DVD-RW SuperDrive
| DVD-ROM/CD-RW Combo Drive| DVD-RW SuperDrive

|-
! rowspan=3 | Connections
! Connectivity
| colspan=6 | 10/100BASE-T Ethernet56k v.92 modem
| colspan=3 | 10/100BASE-T Ethernet56k v.92 modemIntegrated AirPort Extreme 802.11b/g
| colspan=2 | 10/100BASE-T Ethernet56k v.92 modemIntegrated AirPort Extreme 802.11b/gIntegrated Bluetooth 2.0+EDR

|-
! Peripherals
| colspan=11 | 2x USB 2.01x FireWire 400Audio out mini-jack

|-
! Video out
| colspan=11 | Mini-VGA (VGA, composite and S-Video) via adaptors

|-
! rowspan=2 | Operating system
! Original
| colspan=9 | Mac OS X 10.3 "Panther"
| colspan=2 | Mac OS X 10.4 "Tiger"

|-
! Maximum
| Mac OS X 10.4.11 "Tiger"
| colspan=8 | Mac OS X 10.5.8 "Leopard" 
| colspan=2 | Mac OS X 10.5.8 "Leopard"

|-
! rowspan=2 | Dimensions
! Weight
| 4.9 lbs / 2.2 kg
| colspan=2 | 5.9 lbs / 2.7 kg
| 4.9 lbs / 2.2 kg
| colspan=2 | 5.9 lbs / 2.7 kg
| 4.9 lbs / 2.2 kg
| colspan=2 | 5.9 lbs / 2.7 kg
| 4.9 lbs / 2.2 kg
| 5.9 lbs / 2.7 kg

|-
! Volume
| 1.35 x 11.2 x 9.1 inches / 3.4 x 28.4 x 23.1 cm
| colspan=2 | 1.35 x 12.7 x 10.2 inches / 3.4 x 32.3 x 25.9 cm
| 1.35 x 11.2 x 9.1 inches / 3.4 x 28.4 x 23.1 cm
| colspan=2 | 1.35 x 12.7 x 10.2 inches / 3.4 x 32.3 x 25.9 cm
| 1.35 x 11.2 x 9.1 inches / 3.4 x 28.4 x 23.1 cm
| colspan=2 | 1.35 x 12.7 x 10.2 inches / 3.4 x 32.3 x 25.9 cm
| 1.35 x 11.2 x 9.1 inches / 3.4 x 28.4 x 23.1 cm
| 1.35 x 12.7 x 10.2 inches / 3.4 x 32.3 x 25.9 cm

|}

 Expandability and upgrades 
The iBook keyboard lifts up, allowing installation of the AirPort (wireless) card and additional memory. This gives the keyboard a "spongy" effect, especially in G3 iBooks with the translucent keyboard. The "sponginess" was corrected in the PowerPC G4 models.

Accessing the hard disk drive is complex and time-consuming, involving partial disassembly of the unit and the removal of over 30 different-sized screws.

The memory in the iBook G4 is covered by a removable Airport card, and accessible by removing the RAM shield with a Phillips#00 screwdriver. While some of the earlier models (e.g., 800 MHz and 933 MHz) have a specified 640 MB RAM limit, it is possible to have a total of 1.12 GB of RAM installed (128 MB built-in, plus a 1 GB SO-DIMM), or 1.25 or 1.5 GB in the later models with 256 or 512 MB of RAM soldered to the logic board.

Although no longer officially supported by macOS versions beyond those given in the chart above, the system has also been supported via MorphOS (an Amiga compatible OS) since version 3.2.

 Notes 
 A copy of Marble Blast Gold'' came preinstalled on a certain version of the iBook G4 as a promotion of the game.

Quality issues 
Display issues with the iBook line were caused by a notoriously problematic graphics chip, which could have issues with the heatsink or the BGA soldering work done at the factory.  This would manifest in symptoms such as system lockups (as the graphics chip hangs from reaching the thermal limit), or visible graphical artifacts appearing on the screen (from the graphics chip failing).

Apple initiated the "iBook Logic Board Repair Extension Program" in January 2004, which covered the expense of repairing display problems of iBook G3 models for three years. In June 2004, the Repair Extension Program was expanded to cover all White G3 iBooks.

Early models of the iBook G4 also suffered from display problems similar to those of the iBook G3, but were not covered by the repair extension program. Owners of iBooks that required expensive repairs for these problems submitted new class action lawsuits in December 2006.

On May 2, 2007, the Danish Consumer Board published an extensive 3rd party report concerning the Apple iBook G4 logic board issue. A press release referred to the global consequences that this could have for possible guarantee claims.

Some owners of the iBooks that experienced this flaw solved these issues temporarily through applying pressure to the heatsink or graphics chip, using a thin metal shim placed between the heatsink and the graphics chip. This both pushed the heatsink and graphics chip together, bridging the thermal gap, and pushing the graphics chip against the motherboard, temporarily reheating the solder beads back together.

Timeline

References

External links 

 Apple – Support – Specifications – iBook
 Apple – How to identify your iBook
 Apple "MacBook" filing suggests iBook re-branding

Macintosh laptops
Macintosh computers by product line
PowerPC Macintosh computers
Computer-related introductions in 1999